Kwon Jung-Hyuk (born 2 August 1978) is a South Korean football goalkeeper who plays for Gyeongnam FC.

He has played in his own country for Ulsan Hyundai Horang-i, Gwangju Sangmu Bulsajo (army), Pohang Steelers and FC Seoul. In 2009 Kwon signed a one-year contract with Finnish Veikkausliiga club Rovaniemen Palloseura. After the team was relegated at the end of the season, Kwon moved to Vaasan Palloseura. He was rated as the best goalkeeper in Veikkausliiga in Finnish sport magazine Veikkaaja's game to game rankings in 2010.

In 2011, he joined Incheon United.

Club career statistics

References

External links

Tilastohistoria 

1978 births
Living people
Association football goalkeepers
South Korean footballers
South Korean expatriate footballers
South Korea international footballers
Ulsan Hyundai FC players
Gimcheon Sangmu FC players
Pohang Steelers players
FC Seoul players
Incheon United FC players
Gwangju FC players
Bucheon FC 1995 players
Gyeongnam FC players
K League 1 players
K League 2 players
Rovaniemen Palloseura players
Vaasan Palloseura players
Veikkausliiga players
Expatriate footballers in Finland
South Korean expatriate sportspeople in Finland
Korea University alumni